Kochi LNG is a liquefied natural gas (LNG) regasification terminal operated by Petronet LNG in Puthuvype, Kochi, India.
The LNG terminal has been constructed and commissioned in August, 2013 at a cost of Rs.4,200 crores.

General Information
The terminal has been developed by Petronet LNG having the capacity to store and distribute 5-million tonnes per annum. The terminal is currently operating at 8 percent capacity. The present customers are Fertilisers and Chemicals Travancore (FACT),BPCL(Bharat Petroleum Corporation Limited) and Nitta Gelatin India Ltd. So far, two vessels carrying LNG had berthed at the terminal and had unloaded them. Petronet LNG gets the supply of 14.4 lakh tons of LNG per year for the Kochi terminal from the Gorgon project in Australia for a 20-year period as per the deal signed in August 2009.

Location

The terminal is located in Puthuvype, around 12 km (7.5 mi) from the city centre.

Facilities 
 Marine Terminal to receive vessels up to 2,16,000 m3 capacity
 Facilities for storage, re-gasification and dispatch of gas.

References

See also 
 Kochi
 International Container Transshipment Terminal, Kochi

Liquefied natural gas terminals
Economy of Kochi
Energy in Kerala
Companies based in Kochi
Energy infrastructure in India
2013 establishments in Kerala
Energy infrastructure completed in 2013